The women's 4x100 metres relay event at the 2000 World Junior Championships in Athletics was held in Santiago, Chile, at Estadio Nacional Julio Martínez Prádanos on 22 October.

Medalists

Results

Final
22 October

Heats
22 October

Heat 1

Heat 2

Participation
According to an unofficial count, 49 athletes from 12 countries participated in the event.

References

4 x 100 metres relay
Relays at the World Athletics U20 Championships